Masiri (also Romanized as Masīrī; also known as Ḩowẕ-e Māhī) is a former village in Tashan-e Sharqi Rural District, Tashan District, Behbahan County, Khuzestan Province, Iran. The former villages of Masiri, Ablesh, Chahardahi-ye Sohrab, Chahardahi-ye Asgar, Deh-e Ebrahim & Tall Kohneh came together to create the city of Tashan. At the 2006 census, its population was 157, in 30 families.

References 

Populated places in Behbahan County